Chrysopsis mariana, known as the Maryland golden-aster, is a North American species of plants in the family Asteraceae. The Maryland golden-aster ranges from Rhode Island and New York, west to Kentucky and southern Ohio, and south as far as Florida and Texas.

Description
Compared to other asters, the Maryland golden-aster has broader leaves and larger flowers. Because of its silky stems, the Maryland golden-asters are also known as silkgrass. Like its relatives the prairie golden-aster and the grass-leaved golden-aster, the Maryland golden-aster blooms only from August to October. The Maryland golden-aster grows one to two feet tall. It grows in a variety of habitats including fields, natural rock outcrops, and open areas.

References

External links
 Wildflowers of the Southeastern United States, Maryland golden-aster
 North Creek Nurseries, Gardening information on the Maryland golden-aster

mariana
Endemic flora of the United States
Flora of the Eastern United States
Plants described in 1763